Fairylake Botanical Garden or Xianhu Botanical Garden is a  botanical garden and arboretum located at Liantang Subdistrict, Luohu District, Shenzhen, Guangdong, China. Fairylake Botanical Garden at the foot of Wutong Mountain, beside the Shenzhen Reservoir. Fairylake Botanical Garden was categorized as a "national AAAA level tourist site" by the China National Tourism Administration in 2007 and a "national key park" by the Ministry of Housing and Urban-Rural Development in 2008.

History 
Founded in 1983, Fairylake Botanical Garden first opened to the public in 1988. It incorporates scientific research, science popularization, and tourism. As of 2012, there are more than 17 special-category living plant collections and more than 8,000 species of plants in the Fairylake Botanical Garden. On December 18, 2012, the National Cycad Conservation Center was set up here, it has cycads a total of 3 families, 10 genera, and 240 species, ranked second in the world.

Climate
Spring, fall and winter are warm, while winter is relatively dry.

Gardens

Fairylake Botanical Garden has more than twelve themed Gardens, such as:
 Cycad Conservation Center
 Magnolia Garden
 Rare Trees Garden
 Arecaceae Garden
 Bamboo Garden
 Shade tolerance Garden
 Desert Plant Garden
 Fruit Tree Area
 Aquatic Plant Garden
 Peach Garden
 Gymnosperm Garden
 Bonsai Garden

Tourist attractions
Fairylake Botanical Garden is divided into six scenic areas, including the Heaven & Earth Area, the Fairylake Area, the Hongfa Temple Area, the Desert Plant Area, the Fossil Forest Area and the Conifers Azalea Area.

The Fairylake, also known as Lake Xian, is a man-made lake with bridges, pagodas and halls all over the area.

Hongfa Temple, is a Buddhist temple located within the Fairylake Botanical Garden.

Transportation
 Take bus No. 382, 363, 220, or 202 to Fairy Lake Botanical Garden Bus Stop
 Take bus No. N15, 27, 113, K113, 214, 311, 336, 363, 381, 382 or M468 to Luohu Foreign Language School Bus Stop
 Take subway Line 2/8 (Shekou Line) to get off at  Xianhu Road metro station. Getting out from Exit C2 and walk  to Fairy Lake Botanical Garden Bus Stop

References

External links

  
 

Luohu District
Botanical gardens in Guangdong
Parks in Shenzhen